Herman Marion Sadler III (born April 24, 1969) is a candidate for the newly redrawn Virginia State Senate District 17 and was a former American professional stock car racing driver, announcer, professional wrestling promoter, and autism advocate from Emporia, Virginia.  He was a NASCAR driver with occasional appearances for the Virginia Lottery at Martinsville Speedway, Richmond International Raceway, and Bristol Motor Speedway; in 2019, he drove the No. 93 Chevrolet Camaro in the NASCAR Xfinity Series for RSS Racing. He was also a pit reporter with Fox Sports 1 for Xfinity and NASCAR Gander Outdoors Truck Series broadcasts.

Racing career
Sadler began racing in go-karts alongside younger brother Elliott in their hometown of Emporia. He then began running late models in Virginia. In 1992, Sadler made his debut in the NASCAR Busch Series at Orange County Speedway. He started 19th but finished 25th after wrecking his No. 32 Oldsmobile. He ran four more races that season, with a best finish of 20th, at Dover International Speedway and Hickory Motor Speedway.

1993–1998
Sadler began running the Busch Series full-time in 1993. Driving the No. 25 Shell Oil-Virginia is for Lovers-sponsored Oldsmobile for Don Beverly, Sadler picked a win at Orange County, finished tenth in points, and was named NASCAR Busch Grand National Series Rookie of the Year. He followed that up with another win at Orange County and a fifth-place points finish the next season in 1994. After that year ended, Sadler teamed with his father, Herman, to run the No. 1 DeWalt Tools-sponsored Chevrolet. Although he did not win, Sadler had six Top 10 finishes and a thirteenth-place finish in the point standings. He won the pole at the 1996 Milwaukee Mile race, but he continued to drop and finished 15th place in points. He also made his debut in the Winston Cup Series, starting 30th and finishing 37th at the Miller 400 in the No. 26 Chevrolet owned by William Slate.

In 1997, his ride was purchased by Diamond Ridge Motorsports, which also owned Elliott's current ride. Sadler grabbed two more poles and had seven Top 10 finishes, finishing tenth in points. After a nearly identical season in 1998, Sadler was pushed out of the ride, while Elliott signed with Wood Brothers Racing in the Cup Series.

1999–2004
In 1999, Sadler signed to drive the No. 72 MGM Brakes-sponsored Chevy for Ron Parker. But a season-opening failure to qualify, at the NAPA Auto Parts 300, brought an end to the streak of 173 consecutive races for Sadler. After his release from the team following the MBNA Platinum 200, Sadler spent the rest of the season with BACE Motorsports' Bayer-Alka-Seltzer-sponsored entry, and then Innovative Motorsports. In 2000, Sadler signed to drive the No. 30 Little Trees-sponsored Chevy for Innovative, but often did not qualify for races, and was released after six events. After a brief stint of Innovative using interim drivers, Sadler returned to the team for the balance of the season, posting a seventh-place finish at Pikes Peak International Raceway.

In 2001, Sadler and his wife Angela formed their own team, Score Motorsports, and began running a limited schedule in the Winston Cup Series. Running cars purchased from Larry Hedrick Motorsports and with Virginia Lottery sponsoring, he ran three races, his best finish being a 27th at Dover. Sadler returned to the Busch Series in 2002, running a limited schedule in his own No. 02 as well as the No. 43 for the Curb Agajanian Performance Group. His best finish was a 21st at Richmond. Sadler also ran 10 Cup races that year, eight in his own No. 02 entry, and two races for Junie Donlavey.

For 2003, Sadler announced he would run the No. 54 Toys R Us-sponsored Chevy in the Busch Series for Team Bristol Motorsports. Ten races into the season, the team shut down following the Hardee's 250 due to financial difficulties. Sadler ended that Busch Season running three races on his own with Zapf Creations sponsoring. He also ran ten more Cup races in the No. 02 that season, with sponsors such as Dollar Tree, Go Team VA, and Total Nonstop Action Wrestling. Former NBA player Bryant Stith became a co-owner of Score in 2004, and with help from fan donations, Sadler was able to run 30 Busch races, the best finish being a twelfth at Milwaukee. He also ran 16 races in the Cup Series, and had a 23rd-place finish at Talladega Superspeedway, as well as  fielding cars for Carl Long and Andy Belmont. As a team owner, Sadler was the last to compete in a Pontiac, which had pulled out of NASCAR after the 2003 season.

2005–2011
During the lead-up to 2005, Sadler sold his Busch Series team and announced he was selling a large portion of his Cup team to Jeff Stec, owner of Peak Fitness, who would sponsor the new No. 66 car. Sadler continued to struggle despite the new ownership, and resigned from the ride midseason. He spent the balance of the year driving occasional races for Front Row Motorsports, and even returned to the No. 66 for one race in a sponsorship deal with Jerry Kilgore.

In 2006, Sadler ran seven races for MBA Racing, racing the No. 00 Aaron's Rent-sponsored Ford as a partnership with the Michael Waltrip Racing team. Sadler made one start at Martinsville Speedway in 2007 and 2008, driving Chevrolet Silverados for Andy Hillenburg. He ran three truck races for Hillenburg in 2010.

Sadler returned to the Busch Series (now Xfinity Series) for the first time in over five years in 2010, and raced at Richmond in the No. 09 car, sponsored by TNA Impact!, finishing six laps down, in 32nd position. He made two additional starts in Busch that season in the No. 27 Baker Curb Racing Ford, but failed to finish higher than 30th. He made six truck races for Hillenburg, and raced in the 2010 TUMS Fast Relief 500 at Martinsville Speedway, driving for TRG Motorsports. It was his first start in four years in NASCAR Sprint Cup competition and the team cited his prior success at Martinsville as the best chance for TRG to remain in the Top 35; TRG entered Martinsville just fifteen points ahead of 35th and twenty points in front of the 36th place team. Sadler finished 26th and the TRG maintained its top-35 status, and he ran three additional Cup races for TRG in 2011.

2012–present

In 2012, Richard Childress Racing gave him a start in the No. 33 Sprint Cup car at Martinsville in the Goody's Fast Relief 500. Anderson's Maple Syrup sponsored the entry, and Sadler finished 31st at his home track. After sitting out in 2013, Sadler returned to racing late in 2014, driving the late season Nationwide Series short track races at Bristol and Richmond for Tri-Star Motorsports. He piloted the No. 19 Toyota Camry usually driven by Mike Bliss, with Bliss moving to the team's No. 10 entry for these events. The Virginia Lottery sponsored the ride for Sadler. His only starts in 2015 came for JGL Racing at Bristol and Richmond, with Virginia Lottery continuing to sponsor.

After a five-year absence from the Cup Series, Sadler drove the No. 7 Chevy for Premium Motorsports at the 2017 First Data 500 at Martinsville Speedway; after starting the race last, he finished 34th.

On November 17, 2019, Sadler tweeted he had departed Fox NASCAR.

Professional wrestling

Total Nonstop Action Wrestling (2002, 2007, 2009)
In 2002 Sadler had a feud in Total Nonstop Action Wrestling with Ron Killings, and a number of appearances and matches as part of a cross promotion between TNA  and NASCAR. TNA later sponsored Sadler's racing efforts.

As of March 27, 2009, he has been hosting an online web cast show entitled Hermie's Hotseat that can be seen on TNA's YouTube channel where Sadler does candid sit-down interviews with the performers and employees of Total Nonstop Action Wrestling.

United Wrestling Federation (2005–2007)
Hermie started the United Wrestling Federation, wrestling promotion in 2005. At first, the company worked with TNA Wrestling bringing house shows under the TNA/UWF moniker to areas like Detroit, Philadelphia, and other parts of the east coast. Hermie wrestled part-time in his promotion as well, teaming with Rhino, Jeff Hardy, Team 3D, and others.

In late 2006, the UWF ceased co-promoting with TNA and began independent operations in 2007, although they continue to use the six-sided ring that TNA utilized at the time. At a show in Richmond, Virginia on September 29, 2006, Hermie presented a $10,000 check to an autism foundation. On December 5, 2007, he signed with TNA as an announcer.

Global Force Wrestling (2014–2017)
It was announced on April 21, 2014, that Sadler joined the board of directors for Jeff Jarrett's Global Force Wrestling.

Political career

On November 9, 2022, Hermie Sadler announced he is running against Delegate Emily Brewer for the newly redrawn Virginia State Senate District 17. The district includes Suffolk, Isle of Wight County, Portsmouth, Southampton County, Brunswick County, Greensville County, Franklin City, parts of Dinwiddie County, and his life-long hometown of Emporia, Virginia.

Personal life
Sadler graduated from the University of North Carolina and is an avid North Carolina Tar Heels sports fan. Married February 3, 1996, he and his wife Angie have three daughters -– Cora, Halie and Naomi. His oldest daughter, Cora, was a cheerleader at the University of North Carolina, while his youngest plays softball at Randolph-Macon College.  Sadler has publicly talked about his middle daughter, Halie, being on the autism spectrum.

Motorsports career results

NASCAR
(key) (Bold – Pole position awarded by qualifying time. Italics – Pole position earned by points standings or practice time. * – Most laps led.)

Monster Energy Cup Series

Daytona 500

Xfinity Series

Camping World Truck Series

ARCA Re/Max Series
(key) (Bold – Pole position awarded by qualifying time. Italics – Pole position earned by points standings or practice time. * – Most laps led.)

References

External links
 
 
 
 United Wrestling Federation
 Sadler Fan Club

Living people
1969 births
People from Emporia, Virginia
Racing drivers from Virginia
NASCAR drivers
ARCA Menards Series drivers
NASCAR team owners
Professional wrestling promoters
Impact Wrestling
University of North Carolina at Chapel Hill alumni
Richard Childress Racing drivers